M. Abdurahman Salafi is an Islamic scholar, and Arabic professor. He served as one of the secretaries of the Kerala Nadvathul Mujahideen state committee, managing trustee of Kerala Nadvathul Mujahideen  and syndicate member of Calicut University.

References

Living people
21st-century Indian Muslims
21st-century Muslim scholars of Islam
1959 births
People from Malappuram district
Indian Sunni Muslim scholars of Islam